Bittacomorpha clavipes, known as the phantom crane fly (though this name can also apply to any member of Ptychopteridae), is a species of fly in the family Ptychopteridae. It is found in the eastern United States west to the Rocky Mountains. 

It flies upright with its legs spread apart. The female lays hundreds of eggs by dipping its abdomen in the water.

References

Ptychopteridae
Insects described in 1781